Salvia leptophylla (Slenderleaf sage) is a herbaceous perennial that is native to Texas.

Notes

leptophylla
Flora of Texas